Kullaa is a former municipality of Finland. It joined Ulvila on 1 January 2005.

It is located in the province of Western Finland and is part of the Satakunta region. The municipality had a population of 1,601 (2003) and covered an area of 283.19 km² of which 19.46 km² is water. The population density was 5.7 inhabitants per km².

The municipality was unilingually Finnish.

People born in Kullaa
Sofia Hjulgrén (1875–1918) 
Kaarlo Kangasniemi (1941–)
Kauko Kangasniemi (1942–2013)
Hannele Ruohola-Baker (1959–)

External links
 

Populated places disestablished in 2005
Former municipalities of Finland
2005 disestablishments in Finland